Wilmington Island is a census-designated place (CDP) in Chatham County, Georgia. The population was 15,129 at the time of the 2020 U.S. Census. It is part of the Savannah metropolitan area. The communities of Wilmington Island form a large and affluent suburb of Savannah, where most residents work. The island lies east of Savannah between the town of Thunderbolt and the beach community of Tybee Island.

Geography

Demographics

2020 census

As of the 2020 United States census, there were 15,129 people, 6,478 households, and 4,322 families residing in the CDP.

2000 census
As of the census of 2000, there were 14,213 people, 5,613 households, and 4,058 families residing in the CDP. The racial makeup of the CDP was 92.26% White, 3.93% African American, 0.12% Native American, 2.51% Asian, 0.04% Pacific Islander, 0.35% from other races, and 0.79% from two or more races. Hispanic or Latino of any race were 1.32% of the population.

There were 5,613 households, out of which 35.8% had children under the age of 18 living with them, 60.6% were married couples living together, 8.7% had a female householder with no husband present, and 27.7% were non-families. 22.0% of all households were made up of individuals, and 6.0% had someone living alone who was 65 years of age or older. The average household size was 2.53 and the average family size was 2.99.

In the CDP, the population was spread out, with 25.8% under the age of 18, 6.3% from 18 to 24, 33.6% from 25 to 44, 24.8% from 45 to 64, and 9.5% who were 65 years of age or older. The median age was 37 years. For every 100 females, there were 93.9 males. For every 100 females age 18 and over, there were 91.7 males.

The median income for a household in the CDP was $58,689, and the median income for a family was $67,983. Males had a median income of $47,220 versus $31,836 for females. The per capita income for the CDP was $27,654. About 2.3% of families and 3.6% of the population were below the poverty line, including 2.5% of those under age 18 and 2.3% of those age 65 or over.

Education

It is in Savannah-Chatham County Public Schools. Schools include:
 May Howard Elementary School

Gallery

See also
 Wilmington River (Georgia)

References

Census-designated places in Chatham County, Georgia
Census-designated places in Georgia (U.S. state)
Savannah metropolitan area
Populated coastal places in Georgia (U.S. state)